Bulgaria competed at the 2011 World Aquatics Championships in Shanghai, China between July 16 and 31, 2011.

Medalists

Open water swimming

Men

Swimming

Bulgaria qualified 3 swimmers.

Men

Women

Synchronised swimming

Bulgaria has qualified 2 athletes in synchronised swimming.

Women

References

2011 in Bulgarian sport
Nations at the 2011 World Aquatics Championships
Bulgaria at the World Aquatics Championships